Anna Malvina Svennung (born 24 October 1984) is a Swedish rower. She placed 15th in the women's single sculls event at the 2016 Summer Olympics.

References

1984 births
Living people
Swedish female rowers
Olympic rowers of Sweden
Rowers at the 2016 Summer Olympics
21st-century Swedish women